Albaretto della Torre is a comune (municipality) in the Province of Cuneo in the Italian region Piedmont, located about  southeast of Turin and about  northeast of Cuneo.

Albaretto della Torre borders the following municipalities: Arguello, Cerreto Langhe, Lequio Berria, Rodello, and Sinio.

References

Cities and towns in Piedmont
Articles which contain graphical timelines